The Women's sabre event of the 2017 World Fencing Championships was held on 22 July 2017. The qualification was held on 20 July 2017.

Draw

Finals

Top half

Section 1

Section 2

Bottom half

Section 3

Section 4

References
Bracket

2017 World Fencing Championships
World